Alessandro Di Munno (born 3 September 2000) is an Italian professional footballer who plays as a defensive midfielder for  club Novara.

Career

Monza and loans 
Di Munno joined Monza's youth system in 2017. He was sent on loan to Caronnese in the Serie D for the 2018–19 season, where he scored four goals in 34 league appearances. On 23 January 2020, Di Munno was sent on a six-month loan to Serie C side Vis Pesaro. On 17 September 2020, he was sent on a one-year loan to newly-promoted Serie C side Pro Sesto.

Lecco 
On 26 August 2021, Di Munno was sold to Lecco on a permanent transfer. On 27 November 2021, his Lecco contract was terminated by mutual consent.

Novara
On 27 November 2021, he moved to Novara in Serie D.

References

External links 
 
 

2000 births
Living people
Sportspeople from the Metropolitan City of Milan
Footballers from Lombardy
Italian footballers
Association football midfielders
U.C. Sampdoria players
Como 1907 players
A.C. Monza players
S.C. Caronnese S.S.D. players
Vis Pesaro dal 1898 players
S.S.D. Pro Sesto players
Calcio Lecco 1912 players
Novara F.C. players
Serie D players
Serie C players